|}

The Tyros Stakes is a Group 3 flat horse race in Ireland open to two-year-old thoroughbreds. It is run at Leopardstown over a distance of 7 furlongs (1,408 metres), and it is scheduled to take place each year in July.

The event used to be held at the Curragh in mid August. For a period it was classed at Listed level. It was switched to late July in 2000, and it was transferred to Leopardstown in 2003. It was promoted to Group 3 status in 2007.

Records
Leading jockey since 1986 (7 wins):
 Kevin Manning – Via Lombardia (1994), Swift Gulliver (1996), Artistic Blue (1998), Modeeroch (2005), Teofilo (2006), New Approach (2007), Grafelli (2012)

Leading trainer since 1986 (15 wins):

 Aidan O'Brien - Common Spirit (1995), King of Kings (1997), Royal Kingdom (1999), Van Nistelrooy (2002), Rip Van Winkle (2008), Cape Blanco (2009), Zoffany (2010), Gleneagles (2014), Deauville (2015), Churchill (2016), The Pentagon (2017), Anthony Van Dyck (2018), Armory (2019), Military Style (2020), Point Lonsdale (2021)

Winners since 1986

See also
 Horse racing in Ireland
 List of Irish flat horse races

References
 Paris-Turf: 
 Racing Post:

 galopp-sieger.de – Tyros Stakes.
 ifhaonline.org – International Federation of Horseracing Authorities – Tyros Stakes (2019).
 pedigreequery.com – Tyros Stakes – Leopardstown.

Flat races in Ireland
Flat horse races for two-year-olds
Leopardstown Racecourse